Herbert Ploberger (1902–1977) was an Austrian costume designer and art director active in German and Austrian cinema.

Selected filmography
 Savoy Hotel 217 (1936)
 Condottieri (1937)
 Kora Terry (1940)
 The Other Life (1948)
 Dear Friend (1949)
 Hula-Hopp, Conny (1959)

References

Bibliography 
 Fritsche, Maria. Homemade Men In Postwar Austrian Cinema: Nationhood, Genre and Masculinity . Berghahn Books, 2013.

External links 
 

1902 births
1977 deaths
Costume designers
Austrian art directors
People from Wels